The 2014 WNBA season was the 18th season of the Women's National Basketball Association. The season started in May and concluded in September to accommodate the 2014 Women's World Championship.

Notable occurrences
 The New York Liberty returned to the renovated Madison Square Garden after three years of playing at the Prudential Center in Newark, New Jersey.
 Indiana Fever head coach Lin Dunn announced her retirement on May 8; effective at the end of the season.

TV and Internet coverage 
Games aired on ESPN, ESPN2, ABC and NBA TV. The Washington Mystics made history in May 2014 when they debuted Kiswe Mobile's Mystics Live and became the first U.S. professional sports team to stream live games within the venue via a mobile application.

2014 WNBA Draft

On December 12, 2013, the 2014 WNBA Draft Lottery took place. The Connecticut Sun, who had a league-worst record of 10-24 last season, won the draft lottery and had the right to pick first in the 2014 draft. In the draft, held on April 14, the Sun made Chiney Ogwumike of Stanford University the top pick.

Regular season
The timing of the 2014 WNBA schedule and the draft were not finalized at its normal timeframe, as the league and players were negotiating a new collective bargaining agreement during the 2013 season. The previous agreement expired during the 2013 WNBA Finals and a new CBA was reached on February 17, 2014.

On February 6, 2014, the 2014 regular season schedule was announced. The regular season schedule began on May 16 and concluded on August 17.

It was announced on January 22 that the 2014 WNBA All-Star Game would take place on July 19 at 3:00 PM EDT in Phoenix, Arizona.

Team standings
Eastern Conference

Western Conference

Playoffs

Season award winners

Player of the Week award

Player of the Month award

Rookie of the Month award

Postseason awards

Coaches

Eastern Conference
Atlanta Dream: Michael Cooper
Chicago Sky: Pokey Chatman
Connecticut Sun: Anne Donovan
Indiana Fever: Lin Dunn
New York Liberty: Bill Laimbeer
Washington Mystics: Mike Thibault

Western Conference
Los Angeles Sparks: Carol Ross and Penny Toler
Minnesota Lynx: Cheryl Reeve
Phoenix Mercury: Sandy Brondello
San Antonio Silver Stars: Dan Hughes
Seattle Storm: Jenny Boucek
Tulsa Shock: Fred Williams

See also
WNBA
WNBA Draft
WNBA All-Star Game
WNBA Playoffs
WNBA Finals

References

External links
Official Site

 
2014 in American women's basketball
2014–15 in American basketball by league
2013–14 in American basketball by league
Women's National Basketball Association seasons